Dominique Forcioli (6 April 1838 – 9 November 1917) was a French lawyer and left-wing politician.
He was Senator of Algeria from 1883 to 1888, Deputy of Algeria from 1889 to 1898, and Deputy of Corsica from 1905 to 1910.

Life

Dominique Forcioli was born on 6 April 1838 in Ajaccio, Corsica.
He became an advocate in Constantine, Algeria.
In the general elections of 21 August 1881 he ran as a radical candidate for the 1st constituency of the Constantine department, but won only 1,676 votes against the incumbent Gaston Thomson, the candidate of the Opportunist Republicans.
Thomson was also elected in the 2nd constituency of Constantine, which he chose to represent.
There was a by-election in the 1st constituency on 4 December 1881 which the Opportunist candidate Alcide Marie Treille(fr) won by 2,421 votes against 2,298 for Forcioli.

Senator of Algeria

On 7 October 1883 Forcioli ran in a senatorial by-election in the department of Constantine to replace Marcel Lucet, who had died.
He was elected by 53 votes out of 97.
He sat with the small group of the extreme left, and supported the Republican cabinets.
He supported the policies of General Boulanger.
In the triennial renewal Senate elections on 5 January 1888 Forcioli lost by 89 votes against 94 for Georges Lesueur, who was elected.

Deputy of Algeria

In the 22 September 1889 general elections Forcioli ran as a Radical Socialist and Revisionist, and was elected Deputy of Constantine in the first round by 4,029 votes out of 6,106.
He was a member of the Naval Committee.
He now expressed opposition to General Boulanger.
From his position on the questions of Tunisia and Tonkin he must be considered a leader of the nascent colonial group.

In the 20 August 1893 elections he was reelected in the first round by 3,753 votes out of 6,862.
He was particularly involved in improvements to the marine and postal services of Algeria and Corsica, and increases in credits for colonization and administration of Algeria.
He insisted on the need for the Algerian government to be controlled by a body of elected representatives.
In the general election of 8 May 1898 Forcioli  won only 4,885 votes against 5,130 for the journalist Thomson, who was elected in the first round.

Deputy of Corsica

Forcioli ran in the Corsican legislative by-election of 11 January 1902 to replace Emmanuel Arène, who had been elected Senator of Corsica.
He was easily elected as Deputy of Ajaccio by 7,894 votes out of 9,730.
In the Chamber he voted for the law that introduced two years of military service and for the law on separation of church and state.
He was reelected in the second round of the general elections of 6 May 1906 by 7,395 votes against 5,718 for M. Casanelli d'Istria.
He became a member of the judicial reform committee.

Forcioli ran in a senatorial by-election in 1909 to replace two Corsican senators, Arthur Ranc and Emmanuel Arène, who had died.
Thadée Gabrielli and Nicolas Péraldi were elected, Gabrielli with 678 votes and Péraldi with 530, 
Forcioli was the nearest runner-up with 259.
He was defeated in the 8 May 1910 elections by Dominique Pugliesi-Conti(fr), mayor of Ajaccio.
After this he retired from politics.
Forcioli died on 9 November 1917 in Ajaccio, Corsica.

Publications
Publications by Forcioli  as a Senator or Deputy included:

Notes

Sources

1838 births
1917 deaths
Politicians from Ajaccio
Radical Party (France) politicians
French Senators of the Third Republic
Senators of French Algeria
Members of the 5th Chamber of Deputies of the French Third Republic
Members of the 6th Chamber of Deputies of the French Third Republic
Members of the 8th Chamber of Deputies of the French Third Republic
Members of the 9th Chamber of Deputies of the French Third Republic